Juk may refer to:

 JuK, software
 Juk (food), Korean rice porridge
 Juk language, a Mon–Khmer language spoken in Laos
 Ukkusissat Heliport, in Greenland
 Wapan language (ISO 639-3: juk), a Jukunoid language of Nigeria